Christine Marie Arguello (born July 15, 1955) is an American lawyer and jurist serving as a senior United States district judge of the United States District Court for the District of Colorado and is a former Colorado state official. Previously, she was a nominee to the United States Court of Appeals for the Tenth Circuit. She was inducted into the Colorado Women's Hall of Fame in 2014.

Early life and education

Born in Thatcher, Colorado, and raised in Buena Vista, Colorado, Arguello grew up the daughter of a railroad worker who housed his family for a time in a boxcar. Arguello earned a Bachelor of Science degree from the University of Colorado at Boulder in 1977, becoming the first member of her family to graduate college, and then she earned a Juris Doctor from Harvard Law School in 1980.

Career 

Arguello began her law career as an associate in private practice. She worked for Valdes-Fauli, Cobb & Petry in Miami, Florida, from 1980 until 1985, when she joined Holland & Hart as a senior associate. Arguello was promoted to a partner at Holland & Hart in 1988.

In 1991, Arguello joined the University of Kansas School of Law as an associate professor. She was promoted to full professor in 1998.

In 1999, Arguello took a job at the University of Colorado, but changed her mind before ever teaching a class, choosing instead to join the Colorado Attorney General's office as a deputy attorney general, working alongside then-Attorney General Ken Salazar from 1999 until 2002.

After leaving the Colorado Attorney General's office, Arguello joined Davis, Graham & Stubbs in Denver in 2003, and also served as a visiting professor at the University of Denver's Sturm College of Law. In April 2006, she took a leave of absence from Davis Graham to join the University of Colorado as its managing senior associate university counsel. She held that job until she became a federal judge.

Tenth Circuit nomination 

On July 27, 2000, President Bill Clinton nominated Arguello to the seat on the Tenth Circuit after John Carbone Porfilio assumed senior status. 

Arguello previously had been considered by Clinton for a nomination to a district court seat. Clinton had previously nominated James Lyons to the seat in September 1999, but withdrew Lyons' nomination in June 2000. As Arguello had been nominated after July 1, 2000, the unofficial start date of the Thurmond Rule during a presidential election year, no hearings were scheduled on her nomination, and the nomination was returned to Clinton at the end of his term. President George W. Bush chose not to renominate Arguello to the Tenth Circuit.

Later, President George W. Bush nominated Timothy Tymkovich to the Tenth Circuit seat to which Arguello had been originally nominated. Tymkovich won Senate confirmation two years later.

District court service 
On January 30, 2008, Republican United States Senator Wayne Allard of Colorado submitted Arguello's name to the White House as part of a list of seven names for the president to consider nominating to three vacant U.S. District Court judgeships. 

On April 3, 2008, Democratic Senator Ken Salazar included Arguello's name in a list of three names that Salazar was recommending that the president nominate. Arguello's name was included as one of three that the two senators eventually jointly forwarded to the White House. On May 17, 2008, a television station in Denver reported that the White House had accepted Arguello as a Colorado district court nominee. 

On July 10, 2008, Arguello was officially nominated by President George W. Bush to a vacancy on the United States District Court for the District of Colorado created by the retirement of Judge Walker David Miller. 

On September 9, 2008, she received a hearing before the Senate Judiciary Committee. She was voted out of committee two weeks later on September 25. The Senate confirmed Arguello to her district court seat in a voice vote on September 26, 2008. She received her commission on October 21, 2008, and her formal investiture ceremony took place on December 5, 2008. She assumed senior status on July 15, 2022.

2009 U.S. Supreme Court vacancy 
On May 18, 2009, Arguello confirmed to a Denver television station that she had been approached by White House intermediaries one week earlier about being considered to fill a seat on the Supreme Court of the United States. "I said 'yes,'" she told the station. "I wouldn't have gone this far if I didn't think I could serve my country in this way."

Notable decisions
On June 30, 2021, in Sanderson v. United States Center for SafeSport, Inc., she considered a motion by Keith Sanderson asserting that the United States Center for SafeSport and others should be enjoined from suspending him from eligibility to compete in the Tokyo Olympics in sport shooting on August 1–2, 2021, on the basis of a sexual misconduct complaint made against him to SafeSport. She denied Sanderson's motion, writing that he and his attorney needed to serve all the defendants first before she would hand down a ruling.

See also

Barack Obama Supreme Court candidates
Bill Clinton judicial appointment controversies
George W. Bush judicial appointment controversies
List of Hispanic/Latino American jurists

References

External links

Christine M. Arguello District of Colorado

1955 births
Living people
21st-century American judges
21st-century American women judges
American women lawyers
American lawyers
Harvard Law School alumni
Hispanic and Latino American judges
Judges of the United States District Court for the District of Colorado
University of Colorado alumni
United States district court judges appointed by George W. Bush
University of Kansas faculty
University of Denver faculty
University of Colorado faculty